The Bachelor Winter Games is a winter sports-themed reality competition television series that premiered on February 13, 2018 on ABC. It is a spin-off of the reality television game shows The Bachelor and The Bachelorette, and is a winter counterpart to the summer series Bachelor in Paradise. The show is hosted by Chris Harrison and Hannah Storm of ABC’s sister station ESPN. It has been described by ABC as "an ode to the Winter Olympic Games", and aired as counterprogramming against NBC's coverage of the 2018 Winter Olympics. Ashley Brewer presents the play-by-play and live interviews during the games.

The series reunite previous contestants from The Bachelor and The Bachelorette at a winter resort in Manchester, Vermont, where they are competing with contestants from the various international adaptations of the franchise in various winter sports challenges.

Contestants
{| class="wikitable sortable"
|-
!colspan="2"|Name
!Age
!Residence
!From
!Eliminated
|- bgcolor="#7CFC00"
| style="background:#faafbe" |
|Ashley Iaconetti
| align="center" |29
|Los Angeles, California
|The Bachelor – ChrisBachelor in Paradise – Season 2 and 3
| rowspan="2" | WinnerRelationship (Split March 2018)
|- bgcolor="#7CFC00"
| style="background:#9cf;" |
|Kevin Wendt
| align="center" |33
|Waterloo, Ontario
|The Bachelorette Canada|- bgcolor="#7CFC00"
| style="background:#9cf;" |
|Courtney Dober
| align="center" |31
|Sydney, New South Wales
|The Bachelorette Australia
|rowspan="2"|Relationship (Split August 2018)
|- bgcolor="#7CFC00"
| style="background:#faafbe" |
|Lily McManus-Semchyshyn
| align="center" |21
|Auckland, New Zealand
|The Bachelor New Zealand
|- bgcolor="#7CFC00"
| style="background:#9cf;" |
|Dean Unglert
| align="center" |26
|Venice, California
|The Bachelorette – RachelBachelor in Paradise – Season 4
|rowspan="2"|Relationship (Split April 2018)
|- bgcolor="#7CFC00"
| style="background:#faafbe" |
|Lesley Murphy
| align="center" |30
|Fort Smith, Arkansas
|The Bachelor – Sean
|- bgcolor="#7CFC00"
| style="background:#9cf;" |
|Luke Pell
| align="center" |33
|Nashville, Tennessee
|The Bachelorette – JoJo
|rowspan="2"|Relationship (Split before finale aired)
|- bgcolor="#7CFC00"
| style="background:#faafbe" |
|Nastassia "Stassi" Yaramchuk
| align="center" |26
|Malmö, Sweden
|The Bachelor Sweden'|-
| style="background:#faafbe" |
|Bibiana Julian
| align="center" |30
|Miami, Florida
|The Bachelor – Arie
|Split Episode 4
|-
| style="background:#9cf;" |
|Jordan Mauger
| align="center" |34
|Auckland, New Zealand
|The Bachelor New Zealand
|Split Episode 4
|-
| style="background:#faafbe" |
|Ally Thompson
| align="center" |24
|Nelson, New Zealand
|The Bachelor New Zealand
|Episode 3
|-
| style="background:#9cf;" |
|Josiah Graham
| align="center" |29
|Plantation, Florida
|The Bachelorette – Rachel
|Episode 3
|-
| style="background:#9cf;" |
|Christian Rauch
| align="center" |34
|Berlin, Germany
|The Bachelorette GermanyThe Bachelorette Switzerland
|Split Episode 3
|-
| style="background:#faafbe" |
|Clare Crawley
| align="center" |36
|Sacramento, California
|The Bachelor – Juan PabloBachelor in Paradise – Season 1 and 2
|Split Episode 3
|-
| style="background:#faafbe" |
|Yuki Kimura
| align="center" |21
|Atsugi, Kanagawa
|The Bachelor Japan|Episode 3
|-
| style="background:#9cf;" |
|Michael Garofola
| align="center" |37
|Houston, Texas
|The Bachelorette – DesireeBachelor in Paradise – Season 2
|Episode 3 (Quit)
|-
| style="background:#9cf;" |
|Ben Higgins
| align="center" |28
|Denver, Colorado
|The Bachelorette – KaitlynThe Bachelor — Season 20
|Episode 3 (Quit)
|-
| style="background:#faafbe" |
|Tiffany Scanlon
| align="center" |31
|Perth, Western Australia
|The Bachelor Australia
|Episode 3 (Quit)
|-
| style="background:#faafbe" |
|Jenny Helenius
| align="center" |34
|Helsinki, Finland
|The Bachelor Finland|Episode 2
|-
| style="background:#faafbe" |
|Rebecca Carlson
| align="center" |26
|Stockholm, Sweden
|The Bachelor Sweden|Episode 2
|-
|style="background:#9cf;"|
|Benoit Beauséjour-Savard
|align="center"|30
|Montreal, Quebec
|The Bachelorette Canada|Episode 2 (Quit)
|-
|style="background:#9cf;"|
|Eric Bigger
|align="center"|29
|Baltimore, Maryland
|The Bachelorette − Rachel
|Episode 1
|-
| style="background:#9cf;" |
|Jamey Kocan
| align="center" |33
|Santa Monica, California
|The Bachelorette – Rachel
|Episode 1
|-
|style="background:#faafbe"|
|Laura Blair
|align="center"|29
|Wirral, England
|The Bachelor UK
|Episode 1
|-
|style="background:#faafbe"|
|Lauren Griffin
|align="center"|26
|Los Angeles, California
|The Bachelor – Arie
|Episode 1
|-
|style="background:#faafbe"|
|Zoe Tang
|align="center"|25
|Shenzhen, China
|The Bachelor China|Episode 1
|-
|}

Elimination table

Key
 The contestant is male.
 The contestant is female.
 The couple won Bachelor Winter Games''.
 The couples were the runner-ups.
 The contestant went on a date and gave out a rose at the rose ceremony.
 The contestant went on a date and got a rose at the rose ceremony.
 The contestant won the Winter competition, then went on a date and gave out a rose at the rose ceremony.
 The contestant won the Winter competition, then went on a date and got a rose at the rose ceremony.
 The contestant gave or received a rose at the rose ceremony, thus remaining in the competition.
 The contestant won the Winter competition, then went on a date and received the last rose.
 The contestant received the last rose.
 The couple broke up and were eliminated.
 The contestant voluntarily left the show.
 The contestant had to leave the show due to not having a relationship.
 The contestant was eliminated.

Ratings

Notes

References

2010s American reality television series
2018 American television series debuts
2018 American television series endings
American television spin-offs
American Broadcasting Company original programming
Television series by Warner Horizon Television
English-language television shows
Reality television spin-offs
Winter Games
Television shows filmed in Vermont